"Geronimo" is the second single released, in February 2014, by Australian indie pop band Sheppard. It was written by three of its members, Jason Bovino with the siblings, George and Amy Sheppard, and was produced by Stuart Stuart at Analog Heart Studios, Brisbane. It is the first number-one single ever recorded in Brisbane and reached number one on the Australian Singles Chart in April 2014. Having held the position for three weeks, the song became the longest stay at the top of the charts for an Australian artist or band since "Battle Scars" by Guy Sebastian in August 2012. "Geronimo" also held the longest stay at number one on the Australian Singles Chart for any independent release. Furthermore, the track reached the top ten in eleven additional countries.

The title is a reference to the famous Apache military leader Geronimo and the custom of yelling his name before doing a courageous act.  In the song, the courageous act is diving down a waterfall. It is also a reference to the Eleventh Doctor's quote "Geronimo!" in the popular sci-fi British drama Doctor Who. It was certified 7× platinum in Australia. It was also featured as the trailer theme for the 2015 Australian family film Paper Planes and appears in the 2015 film Alvin and the Chipmunks: The Road Chip and its soundtrack. It was also briefly used in Alpha and Omega 4: The Legend of the Saw Tooth Cave, Underdogs and Norm of the North. Sheppard performed the song in the 13th episode of the second season of the television series Girl Meets World, called "Girl Meets Semi-Formal", which aired on Disney Channel on 14 August 2015. The song was a sleeper hit in the United States, where it peaked at number 53 on the Billboard Hot 100 in May 2015.

The Toby Morris directed music video was nominated for Best Video at the ARIA Music Awards of 2014 and the song for ARIA Award for Song of the Year.

Composition
"Geronimo" is written in the key of G major, with a tempo of 142 beats per minute.

Music video
The official music video, which incorporates many costumes and props made from cardboard, tells the story of a rebellion and two war-torn lovers, one played by the band's lead vocalist George Sheppard. The rebels bring to life a Frankenstein-like creature to aid their army. Amidst the chaos, the two lovers reunite and share a kiss. The video was published on YouTube on 1 August 2014 and had received over 49 million views by November 2021.

An alternate 'International Version' music video for the song shows the band performing the song in a warehouse, with various props spelling the word "Geronimo", clips of Sheppard running on a treadmill as various backgrounds are projected behind him and shadow puppets used to spell out the lyrics. This video was released on their YouTube channel on June 23rd, 2014.

Track listing
Digital download
"Geronimo" – 3:37

Remixes (US Digital download)
"Geronimo" – 3:38
"Geronimo"  (Benny Benassi Remix)  – 4:30
"Geronimo"  (Matoma Remix) – 3:32
"Geronimo"  (D-Wayne Remix) – 4:57

Charts

Weekly charts

Year-end charts
"Geronimo" was the highest selling single in Australia by an Australian artist in 2014, fourth overall.

Decade-end charts

Certifications

References

External links
Full Lyrics at LyricsOnDemand.com 

2014 songs
2014 singles
APRA Award winners
Number-one singles in Australia
Sheppard (band) songs
Cultural depictions of Geronimo